The Free Watermen and Lightermen's Almshouses (generally known as the Royal Watermen's Almshouses) on Beckenham Road / Penge High Street, Penge, London Borough of Bromley were built in 1840–1841 to designs by the architect George Porter by the Company of Watermen and Lightermen of the City of London for retired company freemen and their widows. It is the most prominent and oldest of the Victorian almshouses in Penge. In 1973, the almspeople were moved to a new site in Hastings, and the original buildings were converted into private homes. They have been Grade II listed since 1973.

References

Residential buildings completed in 1841
Tudor Revival architecture in England
Almshouses in London
Grade II listed buildings in the London Borough of Bromley
Grade II listed houses in London
Houses in the London Borough of Bromley
History of the London Borough of Bromley